103rd Street/Watts Towers station is an at-grade light rail station on the A Line of the Los Angeles Metro Rail system. The station is located alongside the Union Pacific freight railroad's Wilmington Subdivision (the historic route of the Pacific Electric Railway), at its intersection with 103rd Street, after which the station is named, along with the nearby landmark Watts Towers in the Watts neighborhood of Los Angeles, California.

It is adjacent to the Watts Station, which historically served the Watts, Long Beach, and San Pedro lines of the Pacific Electric Railway.

Service

Station layout

Hours and frequency

Connections 
, the following connections are available:
Los Angeles Metro Bus: 
LADOT DASH: Watts

Notable places nearby 
The station is within walking distance of the following notable places:
 Good Shepherd Convalescent Hospital
 Jordan High School
 Jordan Downs
 Verbum Dei High School
 Watts Senior Center
 Watts Station — former Pacific Electric Railway station listed on the National Register of Historic Places
 Watts Towers

References

A Line (Los Angeles Metro) stations
Railway stations in the United States opened in 1990
1990 establishments in California